Middletown is a city in Des Moines County, Iowa, United States. The population was 363 at the time of the 2020 census. It is part of the Burlington, IA–IL Micropolitan Statistical Area.

History
Middletown was laid out in 1846. In 1940, the Iowa Army Ammunition Plant was established just to the south of Middletown.

Geography
Middletown is located at  (40.827925, -91.260347).

Demographics

2010 census
At the 2010 census there were 318 people in 127 households, including 94 families, in the city. The racial makeup of the city was 95.3% White, 1.6% African American, 1.6% Asian, 0.9% Pacific Islander, and 0.6% from two or more races. Hispanic or Latino of any race were 1.3%.

Of the 127 households 34.6% had children under the age of 18 living with them, 58.3% were married couples living together, 9.4% had a female householder with no husband present, 6.3% had a male householder with no wife present, and 26.0% were non-families. 22.8% of households were one person and 7.8% were one person aged 65 or older. The average household size was 2.50 and the average family size was 2.88.

The median age was 37.5 years. 27.4% of residents were under the age of 18; 5.6% were between the ages of 18 and 24; 26.6% were from 25 to 44; 27% were from 45 to 64; and 13.2% were 65 or older. The gender makeup of the city was 50.9% male and 49.1% female.

2000 census
At the 2000 census there were 535 people in 191 households, including 141 families, in the city. The racial makup of the city was 93.27% White, 2.62% African American, 1.31% Asian, 1.50% from other races, and 1.31% from two or more races. Hispanic or Latino of any race were 2.43%.

Of the 191 households 41.4% had children under the age of 18 living with them, 48.7% were married couples living together, 18.3% had a female householder with no husband present, and 25.7% were non-families. 18.8% of households were one person and 4.7% were one person aged 65 or older. The average household size was 2.62 and the average family size was 2.92.

Age spread:  28.2% under the age of 18, 7.9% from 18 to 24, 31.4% from 25 to 44, 18.7% from 45 to 64, and 13.8% 65 or older. The median age was 36 years. For every 100 females, there were 94.5 males. For every 100 females age 18 and over, there were 89.2 males.

The median household income was $37,083 and the median family income  was $37,500. Males had a median income of $37,000 versus $19,167 for females. The per capita income for the city was $16,835. About 15.4% of families and 19.5% of the population were below the poverty line, including 28.8% of those under age 18 and 16.0% of those age 65 or over.

Education
Middletown is within the Burlington Community School District.

References

Cities in Iowa
Cities in Des Moines County, Iowa
Burlington, Iowa micropolitan area
1846 establishments in Iowa Territory